Ioanna Morfessis is an American businesswoman and economic development strategist and practitioner. She founded four economic development organizations and established programs and tools that became models for communities across the U.S.

Morfessis helped to launch America's first "one-stop" business assistance center for minority enterprises, based in Washington, D.C.;  spearheaded the nation’s first R&D park dedicated to biotechnology firms and institutions, located in Montgomery County, MD;   and catalyzed the City of Phoenix's first public-private economic development partnership, the Phoenix Economic Growth Corporation. She is the founding President/CEO of the Greater Phoenix Economic Council.

Biography

A first generation American of Greek heritage, Morfessis was born in Washington, D.C. She earned a Bachelor of Arts degree from American University, a Master’s of Public Administration from George Washington University, and a Ph.D. in Public Administration from Arizona State University.

Morfessis was the director of resource development for the Greater Washington Business Center in
Washington, D.C. from December 1974 to November 1977. In 1975, she helped to launch the nation's first "one-stop" business assistance center for small minority business enterprises which resulted in the formation of the Metropolitan Washington Minority Purchasing Council, which established and achieved company goals for minority participation in government contracts. She also helped to stage the Opportunity Fair of 1976 – one of the first nationwide minority procurement trade fairs in the U.S.

Morfessis was the appointed the acting director of the Office of Economic Development and Agricultural Development in Montgomery County where she was the key architect of the Shady Grove Life Sciences Center, the U.S.’s first research and development park devoted exclusively to biotechnology. She led the establishment of a partnership between the County, the University of Maryland, Baltimore, and the National Institute of Standards and Technology to develop ultramodern laboratories for R&D in biosciences: the Center for Advanced Research in Biotechnology (CARB). She also facilitated an agreement with Johns Hopkins University to locate a graduate teaching facility at the Life Sciences Center. She recruited Otsuka Pharmaceutical Company to locate in the Shady Grove Life Sciences Center, the first Japanese R&D lab to locate in the U.S. In 1981, Morfessis helped to establish the Economic Advisory Council, a private, blue chip organization of CEOs to advise the County Executive on economic, fiscal, and management issues.

From July 1985 to August 1989, Morfessis was the executive director of the Phoenix Economic Growth Corporation (economic development partnership between Phoenix city government and the private sector) where she executed the city's first private-public partnership for economic development. Then from 1989 to 1997, she was the founding president and CEO of the Greater Phoenix Economic Council (GPEC), an organization originally called Greater Phoenix Partnership. She promoted Arizona’s first statewide economic development strategy (Arizona’s Strategic Plan for Economic Development), becoming the first state to utilize Dr. Michael Porter’s cluster-based theory of economic development as the cornerstone of its strategic plan. The strategy reduced the state's dependence on housing construction and population growth, and encouraged cluster-based industry work groups. During Morfessis' tenure, GPEC-assisted locates, including Sumitomo Sitix, Microchip Technology, Hamilton Standard Aerospace, and AT&T, established more than 164,000 new direct and induced jobs in the Greater Phoenix area, representing $2.7 billion in total employee earnings, and invested more than $20 billion in new plants, buildings, and equipment.

From May 1997 to December 2003, Morfessis served as the first president of the Greater Baltimore region's new private-public partnership for economic development, the Greater Baltimore Alliance. During her tenure, she was responsible for the relocation, expansion, or retention of 34 companies and $5.2 billion of new economic activity. The economic impact of these companies was projected in 2003 to create $14.5 billion in new demand and 11,000 new jobs over ten years. Successful projects included the location or expansion of Sierra Military Health Systems, World Relief international headquarters, and Coca-Cola Enterprises as well as Bank One and the Toyota Financial Corporation. and World Duty Free Americas headquarters. She raised funds to pay for the "Why Baltimore?" campaign which aimed to change the negative attitudes held by many community members. She helped to establish Space Hope, a partnership between the Alliance, NASA, and some of the area’s colleges and universities, and the Greater Baltimore Cultural Alliance, the region’s first organization to coordinate the efforts of the disparate performing and visual arts groups and museums.

In 2004, Morfessis returned to Phoenix to found IO.INC, a consulting practice that helps leaders and their organizations and communities develop and execute strategic economic development programs. IO.INC developed a start-up city — the City of Maricopa, Arizona — and served as the architect of its economic development strategy, programs, and tool kit.

Morfessis created and hosted a cable television program, Business Beat, in Baltimore, Maryland, featuring interviews with the CEOs of major corporations.

Awards and honors

 November 14, 1997: Induction into the Arizona State University College of Public Programs Hall of Fame.
 2000: The Baltimore Business Journal named her one of Baltimore's Most Influential leaders in 2000.
 November 2007: Key participant at the 106th American Assembly entitled "Retooling for Growth: Building a 21st Century Economy in America's Older Industrial Areas".

Articles
 Economic Development Commentary, "Private/Public Partnerships: Economic Development Catalysts for the Future"
 Economic Development Review, "Greater Phoenix Meets Greater Chicago: A New Model for Building and Promoting Community Competitiveness"
 The Arizona Republic, "City that Keeps Moving Up"
 Economic Development Review, "Arizona's Defense/Economic Development Program"
 Economic Development Review, "A Cluster-Analytic Approach to Identifying and Developing State Target Industries: The Case of Arizona"
 Economic Development Commentary, "Corporate Social Responsibility in Economic Development"
 The Sun, "Investing in the Future with Adequate Funding for Higher Education"
 Featured and quoted in "Grassroots Leaders for a New Economy: How Civic Entrepreneurs are Building Prosperous Communities"
 The Arizona Republic  Op-Ed, "Think Young, Think Arizona"
 IEDC Economic Development Journal, "Defining Economic Development Leadership for the 21st Century Globalized Economy: An Anthology of Leadership Perspectives"
 The Arizona Republic, "Arizona Needs to Develop, Stick to Vision for Growth"
 The Arizona Republic, "The Diverse Economy We Must Create"
 The Phoenix Business Journal, "My View: This Lemonade Will be Bitter Even with Sugar Added"
 The Arizona Republic, "Steps To Recovery Require Focus, Cooperation"
 The Arizona Republic, "Like Google, Apple and Uber? Thank an immigrant"

Professional affiliations and community service
Morfessis has and continues to be involved with business and community leadership activities including:
 National Council for Urban Economic Development President 1992–1994
 International Economic Development Council Director 1986–1996, Honorary Lifetime Member
 Maricopa County Community Colleges Foundation Board Member

References

Living people
ASU College of Public Service & Community Solutions alumni
American women chief executives
American people of Greek descent
Economists from Washington, D.C.
Economists from Arizona
21st-century American economists
Year of birth missing (living people)
21st-century American women